Periclimenes affinis is a species of shrimp found in the Pacific and Indian Oceans. It was first named by Leo Zehntner in 1894.

References

Palaemonidae
Crustaceans described in 1894
Taxa named by Leo Zehntner